Francesco Taskayali (Rome, July 4, 1991) is an Italian pianist and composer.

Biography 
Born in Rome to an Italian mother and a Turkish father, he spent his childhood in Istanbul's Cihangir district until the age of five years. In 1996 his parents moved to Latina, a city near Rome, where Taskayali remained until 2008, then he returned to live in Istanbul to finish school. He currently lives in Milan. He began composing music in 2004 at age 13 with the song "È Sera". In 2010 he released his first album Emre, a collection of all the songs composed up to 18 years old, including single "Addio al Terminal".

At the age of 20, Francesco enrolled at Luiss Guido Carli university, studying for a bachelor’s degree in political science. However, unable to successfully pass the sociology exam in the first term, he decided to drop out.

He represented Italy on several occasions: in 2012, performing in Caracas with The Orchestra of El Sistema, 2 June in Berlin for the celebrations of the Republic Day Of Italian, and in 2016 in Los Angeles for the day of the Music Festival. On December 28, 2016 he performed at a charity concert which was hosted in Tbilisi with Nino Surgulazde broadcast live on Georgian television. In his solo career he has performed in more than 15 countries worldwide.

On May 19, 2017, Wayfaring was entering the top 100 most sold cds in Italy.

On August 12, 2017 Spotify has listed "Taksim" in "The Most Beautiful Songs in The World".

Discography

References

External links
  Official website

Living people
Italian male pianists
Italian male composers
Italian people of Turkish descent
1991 births
21st-century pianists
21st-century Italian male musicians